Walayar Dam is a dam in Palakkad district of Kerala, India. This dam is constructed across the  Walayar River which is a tributary of Kalpathipuzha River. It was completed and opened in 1964. It is one of the major sources of irrigation in the region. Most of the water in this river is passed to the inner places of Walayar. The dam holds a larger reservoir area, and the persons living near the reservoir area utilizes the water from the walayar dam as their main water source for irrigation. Currently the water held inside the reservoir is less due to lesser rain at Walayar.
The reservoir area is very scenic and has better scope for tourism.

Gallery

See also
List of dams and reservoirs in India

References

Periyar (river)
Dams in Kerala
Dams completed in 1964
Buildings and structures in Palakkad district
1964 establishments in Kerala
Bharathappuzha
20th-century architecture in India